"Breakdown" is a song written by Jack Johnson, Dan Nakamura & Paul Huston and sung by Jack Johnson. It is the eleventh track on his third album In Between Dreams which was released in February 2005. It was released as a single in September 2005. The video features Jack Johnson surfing in Pichilemu, Chile. The single peaked at #73 in the United Kingdom.

The song was originally featured on the A Brokedown Melody soundtrack. Johnson confessed it was written in a train between Paris and Hossegor, a famous surf spot in France.

A remix of the song was produced by the hip-hop duo Handsome Boy Modeling School (Nakamura & Huston). It is a more upbeat version of the original song, and was featured on their 2004 album, White People.

Charts

Certifications

Other appearances
The Acoustic Album (2006, Virgin)

References

2005 singles
Jack Johnson (musician) songs
Songs written by Jack Johnson (musician)
Rock ballads
2005 songs
Songs written by Prince Paul (producer)
Song recordings produced by Mario Caldato Jr.